In the United States military a Geographically Separate Unit (GSU) is a base that is physically separate from, yet not autonomous of its "parent" base. GSUs are "owned" by their parent organization and are typically quite small.

Assignment to a GSU can be a mixed blessing. The distance from the parent organization means a more relaxed atmosphere. However, it also means that members assigned to the GSU have to travel to the "parent" base for most military services such as the Commissary, Base exchange, or Personnel Unit.

RAF Feltwell, subordinate to the 48th FW of RAF Lakenheath, is an example of a GSU.

See also
 Detachment (military)

Military installations of the United States